Aubrey Harold Woods (9 April 1928 – 7 May 2013) was an English actor.

Biography and career 
Woods was born on 9 April 1928 in Edmonton, Middlesex and grew up in nearby Palmers Green. He was educated at the Latymer School. His first film role was at the age of 17 as Smike in The Life and Adventures of Nicholas Nickleby (1947). On stage he played the role of Fagin in Lionel Bart's production of Oliver! at the New Theatre, St Martin's Lane in the 1960s alongside Nicolette Roeg and Robert Bridges. He played Alfred Jingle in the TV musical Pickwick for the BBC in 1969. Woods' best remembered film role is in Willy Wonka & the Chocolate Factory, where he played the character of Bill, the Candy Store Owner, singing "The Candy Man" near the beginning of the film; the single was later a hit for entertainer Sammy Davis Jr. During the early 1970s he collaborated on the musical Trelawny with friend Julian Slade.

His television credits include Z-Cars, Up Pompeii!, Doctor Who in which he appeared as 'The Controller' in the 1972 four part series 'Day of the Daleks', Blake's 7, Auf Wiedersehen, Pet and Ever Decreasing Circles. He also appeared as Jacob and Potiphar in the 1991 production of Joseph and the Amazing Technicolor Dreamcoat at the London Palladium, the soundtrack of which topped the British albums chart in August 1991. His radio credits include the original radio series of The Hitchhiker's Guide to the Galaxy, appearing in Fit the Sixth. He dramatised E. F. Benson's 1932 comic novel "Secret Lives" in three parts for BBC radio, and was also the narrator.

Death 
Woods died on 7 May 2013, at his home in Barrow-in-Furness aged 85 of natural causes. He was survived by his wife Gaynor, whom he had met at RADA and married in 1952.

Filmography

References

External links

Aubrey Woods in Candida at Vienna's English Theatre, 1977, Arbeiter-Zeitung. (German).
 Aubrey Woods; Aveleyman.com

1928 births
2013 deaths
Alumni of RADA
English male film actors
English male television actors
People educated at The Latymer School
English male singers